Michael Desmond Veivers  (born 12 August 1939) was the Member for Southport from 1987 to 2001 and was Minister for Emergency Services and Sport in the Borbidge Government. He had previously been a Rugby League international.

Veivers was born at Southport in Queensland, Australia. He attended St. Joseph's Nudgee College. He played football in the Brisbane Rugby League premiership for the Souths Magpies and represented Queensland and Australia. He also played in Sydney for the Manly-Warringah Sea Eagles. His cousin, Greg Veivers, was also a rugby league international. Another cousin, Tom Veivers, represented Australia in cricket and also became a Queensland politician.

References

1939 births
Living people
21st-century Australian politicians
Australia national rugby league team players
Australian rugby league players
Australian sportsperson-politicians
Manly Warringah Sea Eagles players
Members of the Order of Australia
Members of the Queensland Legislative Assembly
National Party of Australia members of the Parliament of Queensland
People from the Gold Coast, Queensland
Queensland rugby league team players
Souths Logan Magpies players
Mick
Rugby league players from Gold Coast, Queensland
Rugby league second-rows